Sons of the Sea is a 1939 British colour drama film directed by Maurice Elvey and starring Leslie Banks, Kay Walsh, Mackenzie Ward and Cecil Parker.

Synopsis
Britain, 1939. The head of Dartmouth Naval College is murdered. His successor, Captain Hyde, believes that he himself was in fact the intended target of the assassination. He soon begins to realise that both British and foreign intelligence agents are at work. He enlists the help of his son, a reluctant sea cadet, to smoke them out.

Cast
 Leslie Banks as Captain Hyde
 Kay Walsh as Alison Devar
 Mackenzie Ward as Newton Hulls
 Cecil Parker as Commander Herbert
 Simon Lack as Philip Hyde
 Ellen Pollock as Margaret Hulls
 Peter Shaw as John Strepte
 Nigel Stock as Rudd
 Kynaston Reeves as Professor Devar
 Charles Eaton as Commander-in-Chief

Production
Sons of the Sea was filmed during the summer of 1939, just before the outbreak of the Second World War, something explored in the themes of the film. It is the only feature film to be shot using the Dufaycolor process, and, since restoration, it has been shown on BBC television and on Talking Pictures TV.

Reception
The film premiered in London on 11 March 1940, at the then recently opened Cinephone cinema at 241 Oxford Street, with the attendance of the main star, Leslie Banks.

References

External links
 
 
 

1939 drama films
1939 films
1930s spy drama films
British spy drama films
1930s English-language films
Films directed by Maurice Elvey
British drama films
Films set in Devon
Films shot at Rock Studios
1930s British films
1940s British films